Mimoruza is a monotypic moth genus of the family Noctuidae. Its only species, Mimoruza nigriceps, is found in the Indian state of Sikkim. Both the genus and species were first described by George Hampson in 1895.

References

Acontiinae